The 2016–17 Rwanda National Football League, known as the Azam Rwanda Premier League for sponsorship reasons, is the 40th season of top-tier football in Rwanda. The season started on 14 October 2016 and concluded on 15 June 2017.

Standings
  1.Rayon Sports                  30  22  7  1  63-20  73  Champions
  2.Police FC                     30  17 10  3  50-26  61
  3.APR FC                        30  15 12  3  39-20  57
  4.AS Kigali                     30  15  8  7  36-23  53
  5.Bugesera FC               30  13 11  6  35-22  50
  6.Musanze FC                    30  12  9  9  36-34  45
  7.Etincelles FC                 30  10 10 10  25-29  40
  8.Espoir FC                     30   9 12  9  22-20  39
  9.Sunrise FC                    30   8  9 13  26-31  33
 10.Amagaju FC                    30   9  6 15  25-33  33
 11.Kirehe FC                     30   8  8 14  26-32  32
 12.Mukura VS                     30   8  8 14  28-42  32
 13.Marines FC                    30   8  6 16  25-40  30
 14. Gicumbi FC                    30   7  7 16  27-48  28
 --------------------------------------------------------
 15.Kiyovu Sports                 30   6  9 15  29-45  27
 16.Pepinières FC                 30   3  8 19  21-48  17  Relegated

References

Rwanda National Football League seasons
National Football League
National Football League
Rwanda